Brookfield Township, Ohio, may refer to:

Brookfield Township, Noble County, Ohio
Brookfield Township, Trumbull County, Ohio

Ohio township disambiguation pages